Mahendra Kumari Limbu is a Nepali politician and a member of the House of Representatives of the federal parliament of Nepal. She was elected in the 2017 legislative election under the proportional representation system from Nepali Congress, filling the reserved seat for women and indigenous groups. She is also a member of the Law, Justice and Human Rights Committee of the parliament. In the Nepali Congress shadow cabinet, she is a member of the Ministry of Home Affairs.

References

Living people
21st-century Nepalese women politicians
21st-century Nepalese politicians
Place of birth missing (living people)
Nepali Congress politicians from Koshi Province
Limbu people
Nepal MPs 2017–2022
Members of the 2nd Nepalese Constituent Assembly
1959 births